Kurt Warner's Arena Football Unleashed is a sports video game developed and published by Midway for the Sony PlayStation. It was released in North America on May 18, 2000. It is of note that it would not be until 2006 before another Arena Football League video game would be released. It is based around the fame of American football quarterback Kurt Warner, a former AFL player for the Iowa Barnstormers who later went on to star in the NFL.

Gameplay

Kurt Warner's Arena Football Unleashed differs from other American football video games due to its usage of the arena football system. A few rule changes include that there are half as many players on the field, field goals go back into play if they miss the goalposts, and there's no such thing as punting. The game is compared to NFL Blitz 2000 for its violence controls, modes, and general game structure,  with one reviewer even noted that "The post-play violence has been pumped up to the level that Blitz had before the NFL forced Midway to tone it down." Unlike NFL Blitz it takes 20 yards to get a first down instead of 30, though this can be changed to 10 or 30 yards in the options menu.

Reception

Kurt Warner's Arena Football Unleashed received mostly poor reviews, portraying it as being a weaker version of NFL Blitz 2000. GameSpot criticized the game and gave it a low score. "It's a scaled-down version of Blitz 2000 with a few changes, but these changes don't really enhance the game in any way." IGN wrote, "... the actual game engine seems more like a poor man's Blitz."

External links

References

2000 video games
Arena football video games
Midway video games
North America-exclusive video games
PlayStation (console) games
PlayStation (console)-only games
Warner
Warner
Video games based on real people
Video games developed in the United States

NFL Blitz video games